Jason Lafrenière (born December 6, 1966) is a Canadian former professional ice hockey player who played 146 games in the National Hockey League. He played with the Tampa Bay Lightning, New York Rangers, and Quebec Nordiques between 1986 and 1994. 

Prior to turning professional Lafreniere played major junior in the Ontario Hockey League, where he was named to the First All-Star Team in the 1985–86 season after recording 132 points in 62 games.

Born in St. Catharines, Ontario, Lafreniere is the son of the former NHL hockey player, Roger Lafreniere.

Career statistics

Regular season and playoffs

References

External links

1966 births
Living people
Atlanta Knights players
Bakersfield Condors (1998–2015) players
Belleville Bulls players
Brantford Alexanders players
Canadian expatriate ice hockey players in Germany
Canadian ice hockey centres
Courmaosta HC players
Denver Rangers players
EC VSV players
Edinburgh Capitals players
EV Landshut players
Canadian expatriate ice hockey players in Poland
Flint Spirits players
Fredericton Express players
Guildford Flames players
Hamburg Crocodiles players
Hamilton Steelhawks players
Hannover Scorpions players
HC Merano players
HDD Olimpija Ljubljana players
Ice hockey people from Ontario
Kalamazoo Wings (1974–2000) players
Milwaukee Admirals (IHL) players
New York Rangers players
Phoenix Roadrunners (IHL) players
Podhale Nowy Targ players
Quebec Nordiques draft picks
Quebec Nordiques players
San Diego Gulls (IHL) players
Sheffield Steelers players
Sportspeople from St. Catharines
Tampa Bay Lightning players
TYSC Trappers players
Canadian expatriate ice hockey players in England
Canadian expatriate ice hockey players in Scotland
Canadian expatriate ice hockey players in Italy
Canadian expatriate ice hockey players in the Netherlands
Canadian expatriate ice hockey players in Austria
Canadian expatriate ice hockey players in Slovenia